Lenguazaque is a municipality and town of Colombia in the department of Cundinamarca. It borders Guachetá in the north, Ubaté in the west, Cucunubá in the south and Villapinzón in the east.

History 
In the time of the Muisca Confederation, before the Spanish conquest, Lenguazaque was ruled by the zaque of Hunza, currently known as Tunja, Boyacá. Modern Lenguazaque was founded by Spanish conquistador Gonzalo Jiménez de Quesada early on in his conquest of the central highlands of Colombia, on March 13, 1537.

Lenguazaque in the Chibcha language of the Muisca means "end of the reign of the zaque".

Economy 
The main economic activity in Lenguazaque is coal mining. Also agriculture is executed, predominantly potatoes and to a lesser extent peas, maize, barley and wheat.

References 

Municipalities of Cundinamarca Department
Populated places established in 1537
1537 establishments in the Spanish Empire
1537 disestablishments in the Muisca Confederation
Muysccubun